Ad Visser (born 28 April 1947, in Amsterdam) is a Dutch VJ, presenter, writer, and music artist.

Career in the music industry 
In 1965, Visser performed with his avant-garde pop trio Blurp on AVRO television.

He presented the AVRO programmes Superclean Dreammachine (1968–1980) and TopPop (1970–1985).

In 1982, he wrote a science-fiction novel called Sobriëtas and released an accompanying record as a multimedia project. The album was released in 18 countries and the single from the album, "Giddyap a Gogo", which Visser recorded with Daniel Sahuleka, reached the Dutch Top 40, which resulted in Visser's only appearance as an artist in his own Toppop programme.

In the 1990s, Visser released the Brainsessions CDs which generate alpha waves to give the listener a trance-like experience.

Discography 
Het Geheim van de Wonderbaarlijke Kubus (Mamicha Music, 1981)
Sobriëtas (CBS, 1982)
Adventure (CBS, 1983)
Hi-tec Heroes (Vertigo, 1987)
Ad Visser's Brainsessions (Arcade, 1995)
Ad Visser's Brainsessions, Vol. 2 (Arcade, 1997)
Ad Visser's Kamasutra Experience (Universal, 1999)

Bibliography 
 Ad Visser: Strange days. Muzikale avonturen in de 60's en 70's. Baarn, Marmer, 2015. 
 Ad Visser: De parade van de hemelse tragedie. De langste song ter wereld. Vianen, The House of Books, 2005.  
 Ad Visser: Sobriëtas. Amsterdam, Meulenhoff, 1982.   (German translation by Hildegard Höhr, München, Heyne, 1989)

References

External links 

 Homepage
 Avro-article about Toppop
 Sobriëtas on Araglins Music blog

1947 births
Living people
Dutch television presenters
Dutch science fiction writers
Dutch musicians
VJs (media personalities)
Mass media people from Amsterdam